The Nooksack Giant was a superlative Coast Douglas-fir (Pseudotsuga menziesii var. menziesii) that grew at Loop's Ranch (now Alpenglow Farm) in Maple Falls in Washington State. It was felled in the 1890s. It produced more than 96,000 board feet of lumber. The New York Times regarded the tree in a March 7, 1897 issue as the "most magnificent fir tree ever beheld by human eyes" and called its destruction a "truly pitiable tale" and a "crime". The Morning Times of February 28, 1897 claimed that the wood, sawed into one-inch strips, would reach from "Whatcom [the tree's location] to China".

See also 
 List of tallest trees

References

 

1890s in Washington (state)
Whatcom County, Washington
Individual trees in Washington (state)
Individual Douglas firs